The Tecnam P2008 is a single-engine, high-wing two-seat aircraft built in Italy but aimed at the US market.  It is the first Tecnam aircraft to incorporate major composite components. It was introduced at the AERO Friedrichshafen 2009 show, with first deliveries in December 2009.

Design and development
The P2008 is a conventionally laid out strut braced high-wing monoplane aimed specifically at the US market.  Resembling the earlier Tecnam P92 and P2004 in general appearance, the P2008 differs by introducing  a carbon fibre fuselage and integrated fin. The wings and tailplane are all-metal.  It can be adapted to LSA, ultralight or ELA1 categories.

The wing leading edge is straight except for some pinching at the root and the wing has constant chord over about the inner 60% of span.  Outboard, the trailing edge is tapered; the straight wing tips are slightly upturned.  Frise ailerons on piano hinges span the outboard sections and the inner sections are spanned by slotted flaps. There is a single lift strut on each side, attached to the lower fuselage. The P2008 has a low set all-moving constant chord tailplane with an anti-balance tab.  The fin is swept and the rudder moves above the tailplane.

The P2008 is powered by a Rotax 912ULS flat four piston engine driving a two blade propeller.  The cabin seats two side-by side with a door each side and baggage space behind.  The cabin and cabin doors are wider than on earlier Tecnam high-wing aircraft.  Its fixed tricycle undercarriage has spring cantilever main legs and a castoring, non-steerable nosewheel on a compressed rubber suspension.  Ground steering is achieved by differential braking.  All wheels have speed fairings.

The first flight was on 30 September 2008.

Operational history

The first P2008 was delivered to the US in December 2009. By November 2010 six had been registered in Australia, Italy, South Korea and the United States. As of January 2013 five have been registered in New Zealand, including two as Class 2 Microlights

Variants
P2008
Base model with a  Rotax 912ULS engine.
P2008 TC
Turbocharged  Rotax 914 engine with three blade propeller.
P2008 JC
Certified version under EASA CS-VLA rules.

Specifications

References

External links

Tecnam aircraft
2000s Italian civil utility aircraft
Single-engined tractor aircraft
High-wing aircraft
Aircraft first flown in 2009